This is a list of colonial heads of Ifni (1958–1969), a Spanish province on the Atlantic coast of Morocco. It was located across the Atlantic from the Canary Islands, and south of Agadir.

List of Government Delegates
(Dates in italics indicate de facto continuation of office)

 6 Apr 1934 - 1934-Osvaldo Fernando Capaz Montes (as commander)      (b. 1874 - d. 1936) 
6 Sep 1934 – 10 May 1935  Rodríguez de la Herranza
10 May 1935 – 15 Aug 1936  Juanjo Montero Cabañas
15 Aug 1936 – 15 Oct 1937  Rafael Molero Pimentel
16 Oct 1937 – Mar 1952     Juan Fernández Aceytuno y Montero
Mar 1952 – 11 Aug 1957     José Martín Álvarez-Chas de Berbén   (b. 1918 - d. 1957)
11 Aug 1957 – Aug 1957- José María Troncoso Palleiro
Aug 1957 - Mar 1958        Francisco Mena Díaz                  (b. 1913 - d. 2007)

Governor-general of Ifni
12 Jan 1958 - 12 Feb 1959  Mariano Gómez Zamalloa y Quirce      (b. 1897 - d. 1973)
12 Feb 1959 - 15 Nov 1961  Pedro Latorre Alcubierre             (b. 1900 - d. 1995)
15 Nov 1961 -  3 May 1963  Joaquín Agulla y Jiménez-Coronado    (b. 1902 - d. 1971)
3 May 1963 -  5 Nov 1965  Adolfo Artalejo Campos               (b. 1905 - d. 1965) 
11 Nov 1965 - 30 Apr 1967  Marino Trovo Larrasquito             (d. 1967)
9 May 1967 - 25 Jun 1969  José Miguel Vega Rodríguez           (b. 1913 - d. 1992)

Ifni, Colonial governors
Ifni, Colonial governors
Ifni, Colonial governors
Ifni, Colonial governors
Colonial governors of Ifni
Ifni
Ifni
Ifni, Colonial governors